Gravitometer may refer to:

 Gravimeter, an instrument for measuring the local gravitational field
 Hydrometer, referred to in pipeline work as a gravitometer

Gravimetry